The 2019–20 Coupe de France preliminary rounds, Paris-Île-de-France was the qualifying competition to decide which teams from the leagues of the Paris-Île-de-France region of France took part in the main competition from the seventh round.

A total of eleven teams qualified from the Paris-Île-de-France preliminary rounds. In 2018–19, Noisy-le-Grand FC progressed furthest in the main competition, reaching the round of 32 before losing to SC Bastia.

Schedule
The first two rounds of the qualifying competition took place during the 2018–19 season. The first round consisted of the clubs in the district leagues (level 9 and below of the French league system). 360 teams entered at this stage, and the draw was made on 28 March 2019. An additional 87 teams from the regional league (levels 6 to 8) entered at the second round stage, with one winner from round 1 (FC Romainville) being given a bye to round three. The draw was published on 2 May 2019 with matches taking place in June.

The third round draw was made at the end of August 2019, with the remaining teams from Championnat National 3 (tier 5) joining the competition. 68 ties were scheduled, with seven second round winners given byes to the fourth round (UJA Maccabi Paris Métropole, AC Houilles, AS Ballainvilliers, Cergy Pontoise FC, FC Morangis-Chilly, OFC Pantin, US Mauloise).

The fourth round draw was made on 17 September 2019, with the nine Championnat National 2 teams entering, and 42 ties drawn. The fifth round draw was made on 1 October 2019, with the two Championnat National teams entering, and 22 ties drawn.

The sixth round draw was made on 15 October 2019, with 11 ties drawn.

First round 
These matches were played between 18 April and 5 May 2019, with one tie replayed on 30 May 2019. Tiers shown reflect the 2018–19 season.

Second round 
These matches were played between 16 May and 16 June 2019. Tiers shown reflect the 2018–19 season.

Third round 
These matches were played on 15 September 2019.

Fourth round 
These matches were played on 28 and 29 September 2019.

Fifth round 
These matches were played on 12 and 13 October 2019.

Sixth round 
These matches were played on 26 and 27 October 2019.

References

Preliminary rounds